Kovid Foythong (Thai โกวิทย์ ฝอยทอง) is a Thai former football player. He was a defender with the national team from 1992 to 2000. Besides Thailand, he has played in Germany.

He played for Thailand in a few 1994 FIFA World Cup qualifying matches.

References

1977 births
Living people
Kovid Foythong
Kovid Foythong
Kovid Foythong
Kovid Foythong
Kovid Foythong
Kovid Foythong
Association football midfielders
Association football fullbacks
Footballers at the 1994 Asian Games
Kovid Foythong
Kovid Foythong